skyTV is a South Korean satellite television broadcaster owned by Skylife, a subsidiary of KT Corporation.

Assets

Channels operated by skyTV 
 ENA: comprehensive drama and entertainment channel (formerly skyDrama, SKY)
 : variety channel (formerly skyENT, NQQ)
 : encore drama channel (formerly DramaH)
 : women and game channel (formerly Trendy, TrendE)
 : lifestyle channel (formerly )
 skyUHD: 24-hour UHD comprehensive channel
 : masterpiece curation channel (formerly , which aired pets-related)
 ViKi: premium adult channel
 : children's English education channel
 Sky Sports: sports channel (operated by Sky-K, joint venture with K League Federation)

Formerly owned by skyTV 
 sky A&C – life
 skyHealing
 skyICT

External links 
 Official website 
 Official website (pre-ENA) 

Satellite television
Television networks in South Korea